Mithridates I Callinicus was a king of Orontid Iranian descent who lived during the late 2nd century BC and early 1st century BC. Mithridates was a prince, the son, and successor of King of Commagene, Sames II Theosebes Dikaios. Before his succession in 109 BC, he married the Syrian Greek Princess Laodice VII Thea , daughter of King Antiochus VIII Grypus and Ptolemaic princess Tryphaena, as a part of a peace alliance. Mithridates embraced Greek culture. Laodice bore Mithridates a son, Antiochus I Theos of Commagene (c. 86 BC–38 BC), a prince and future king of Commagene. Mithridates died in 70 BC and Antiochus succeeded him.

See also
 List of rulers of Commagene
 Mount Nemrut

Sources

References

70 BC deaths
2nd-century BC rulers in Asia
1st-century BC rulers in Asia
Year of birth unknown
Kings of Commagene